KOHO Financial Inc. (styled as KOHO) is a Canadian fintech company based in Toronto. While it is not a bank, the company provides banking services in partnership with Peoples Trust through a mobile app and prepaid Mastercard card.

History
KOHO was founded in 2014 in Vancouver. In 2015, the project was launched, offering its services through their mobile app in beta. The service's launch was announced for 2016 but was pushed back to 2017. The company partnered with Peoples Trust and Mastercard for its banking services with the company providing all of the APIs and User Interfaces. Funds deposited into a KOHO card are not insured by the Canada Deposit Insurance Corporation, and will be returned to account holders by Peoples Trust in the event KOHO fails.

Later in 2017, KOHO moved its headquarters to Toronto, after again receiving investment from Portag3 Ventures.

In 2019, KOHO was able to secure $25 million in second round funding after successful growth and accumulating 120,000 accounts in Canada. In 2020, amid the COVID-19 pandemic, KOHO partnered with the CRA to allow their users to receive their emergency funds directly into their KOHO accounts.

On August 19, 2020, KOHO partnered with Manzil to launch the very first Halal Prepaid Mastercard program in Canada.

Awards and distinctions
 Nasdaq FinTech Innovation Award (2015)

See also
Neobank

References

Online financial services companies of Canada
Financial services companies established in 2014
Canadian companies established in 2014
Companies based in Toronto
2014 establishments in British Columbia
Neobanks